Hellenism may refer to:

Ancient Greece
 Hellenistic period, the period between the death of Alexander the Great and the annexation of the classical Greek heartlands by Rome
 Hellenistic Greece, Greece in the Hellenistic period
 Hellenistic art, the art of the Hellenistic period
 Hellenistic Judaism, a form of Judaism in the ancient world that combined Jewish religious tradition with elements of Greek culture
 Hellenistic philosophy, a period of Western philosophy that was developed in the Hellenistic civilization following Aristotle and ending with the beginning of Neoplatonism
 Hellenistic religion, systems of beliefs and practices of the people who lived under the influence of ancient Greek culture during the Hellenistic period and the Roman Empire (c. 300 BCE to 300 CE)

Modern
 Hellenism (neoclassicism), an aesthetic movement in 18th and 19th century England and Germany
 Hellenism (modern religion), Hellenic and Hellenistic religious groups rooted in praxis, cultural values, philosophy of the Greeks and Greek history.

See also
 Hellenic (disambiguation)
 Hellenic studies
 Hellenization, the spread of Greek culture to other peoples
 Panhellenism, the nationalism of Greeks and Greek culture